Bonet may refer to:

Bonet (surname), including a list of people with the name
Bonet de Lattes, Jewish physician and astrologer
Son Bonet Aerodrome
Casa Bonet (Andorra), heritage house
Felt, Vol. 2: A Tribute to Lisa Bonet, album of hip hop duo Felt
Sent Bonèt Briança, commune in the Haute-Vienne department, France 
Sent Bonèt (de Belac), commune in the Haute-Vienne department, France

See also
 Bonnet (disambiguation)